Zheldybino is a rural locality (a village) in Kiprevskoye Rural Settlement, Kirzhachsky District, Vladimir Oblast, Russia. The population was 125 as of 2010. There are 3 streets.

Geography 
Zheldybino is located on the Vakhchilka River, 13 km northeast of Kirzhach (the district's administrative centre) by road. Baburino is the nearest rural locality.

References 

Rural localities in Kirzhachsky District